Anatol is a masculine given name, derived from the Greek name Ἀνατόλιος Anatolius, meaning "sunrise".

The Russian version of the name is Anatoly (also transliterated as Anatoliy and Anatoli). The French version is Anatole. A rarer variant is Anatolio.

Saint Anatolius of Laodicea was a third-century saint from Alexandria in Egypt. Anatolius was also the name of the first Patriarch of Constantinople.

People
Notable people with the name include:

 Anatol Chiriac (born 1947), Moldovan composer
 Anatol Ciobanu (born 1934), Moldovan professor
 Anatol Codru (1936–2010), Moldovan writer
 Anatol Dumitraș (1955–2016), Moldovan singer
 Anatol E. Baconsky (1925–1977), Romanian poet
 Anatol Fejgin (1909–2002), Polish intelligence officer
 Anatol Heintz (1898–1975), Norwegian palaeontologist
 Anatol, artist's name of Anatol Herzfeld (1931–2019), German sculptor
 Anatol Hrytskievich (born 1929), Belarusian historian
 Anatol Josepho (1894–1980), Siberian-American inventor
 Anatol Lieven (born 1960), British author
 Anatol Petrencu (born 1954), Moldovan politician
 Anatol Pikas (born 1928), Swedish psychologist
 Anatol Provazník (1887–1950), Czech organist
 Anatol Rapoport (1911–2007), Russian-American psychologist
 Anatol Rosenfeld (1912–1973), German philosopher
 Anatol Roshko (born 1923), American engineer
 Anatol Șalaru (born 1962), Moldovan politician
 Anatol Stern (1899–1968), Polish poet
 Anatol Țăranu (born 1951), Moldovan politician
 Anatol Teslev (born 1947), Moldovan football coach
 Anatol Tschepurnoff (1871–1942), Russian-Finnish chess player
 Anatol Vasilyevich Kuragin, a fictional character in Tolstoy's War and Peace
 Anatol Vidrașcu (born 1949), Moldovan writer
 Anatol Vieru (1926–1998), Romanian composer
 Anatol Yusef (born 1978), British actor
 Anatol Zhabotinsky (1938–2008), Russian physicist

Fictional character 
 Anatole Kuragin from Tolstoy's War and Peace

Other
 Cyclone Anatol was the name given to a European windstorm that struck in early December 1999.

References

Masculine given names